The Convent School, or Early Experiences of A Young Flagellant is a 19th-century work of sado-masochistic pornography, written under the pseudonym Rosa Coote and published by William Dugdale in London in 1876.  Henry Spencer Ashbee catalogues it with the comment that "the numerous flagellations, supplemented by filthy tortures, are insuperably tedious and revolting".  The principal character and ostensible author Rosa Coote also appears in a series of related stories in The Pearl magazine.

References
 Pisanus Fraxi, Catena Librorum Tacendorum III, 1885, p. 246
 Iwan Bloch, William H Forstern, Sexual Life in England, past and present, F. Aldor, 1938, p. 361
 Fernando Henriques, Prostitution and Society; a survey, MacGibbon & Kee, 1962, p. 245
 Barbara Kanner, Women in English Social History 1800-1914. vol. 2, Garland Publ., 1988, p. 540

External links

1876 British novels
British erotic novels
BDSM literature
Works published under a pseudonym
Books about flagellation